Platamona (Sassarese: "Pratamona or Prattamona") is a coastal area in northern Sardinia, Italy, located along the Gulf of Asinara, in the municipality of Sassari, between the commune of Sorso and Porto Torres.

The name Platamona comes from the Greek platamon-onos, that means flat surface.

It is constituted by a beach of white sand and shells, surrounded from a wood of maritime pines and thousand-year trees of junipers, and a retro-dunal lagoon, where you can practise birdwatching and fishing.

The coast is a Site of Community Importance (SCI) and the lagoon a protected oasis.

The tourist development of the place began after 1950, when the malaria was overcome. Today the beach is the principal tourist seaside location in the municipality of Sassari, there are present some hotels, restaurants, campings, bed & breakfasts, supermarkets and resorts, and also one air field, with a flying school, an Emergency Medical Service ambulatory, a thalassotherapy treatment centre and a waterpark (located in Marina di Sorso).

References

Sassari
Frazioni of the Province of Sassari
Geography of Sardinia